Gershon Zak (1913–1989) was the head of the Sea service which became the Israeli Navy, at that time there was no commander till Paul Shulman came and both Paul Shulman and Zak were in charge, Shulman as commander and Zak as Administrative from MOD.

Biography
Born in the Russian Empire in 1913, Zak made aliyah to Mandate Palestine, where he joined the Haganah. On 17 March 1948 future Prime Minister David Ben-Gurion (and at the time the leader of the Haganah) gave the order to create a Jewish naval service. He remained as head of the Sea Service that became the Israeli Navy until April 1949 when he resigned in order to pursue a career in teaching. The following year he established the HaKfar HaYarok youth village.

Zak was a member of the executive at Yad Levi Eshkol. He was also responsible for renaming HaKfar HaYarok in memory of Levi Eshkol after his passing.

Awards and honours

In 1986, Zak, together with HaKfar HaYarok, won the Israel Prize for lifetime achievement to education.

See also
List of Israel Prize recipients

References

1913 births
Ukrainian Jews
Soviet emigrants to Mandatory Palestine
Haganah members
Israeli Navy generals
Israeli educators
20th-century Israeli Jews
Israel Prize in education recipients
1989 deaths